Salix herbacea, the dwarf willow, least willow or snowbed willow, is a species of tiny creeping willow (family Salicaceae) adapted to survive in harsh arctic and subarctic environments.  Distributed widely in alpine and arctic environments around the North Atlantic Ocean, it is one of the smallest of woody plants.

Distribution

Salix herbacea is adapted to survive in harsh environments, and has a wide distribution on both sides of the North Atlantic, in arctic northwest Asia, northern Europe, Greenland, and eastern Canada, and further south on high mountains, south to the Pyrenees, the Alps and the Rila in Europe, and the northern Appalachian Mountains in the eastern United States. It grows in tundra and rocky moorland, usually at over  elevation in the south of its range but down to sea level in the Arctic.

Description
The dwarf willow is one of the smallest woody plants in the world. It typically grows to only  in height, with spreading prostrate branches, reddish brown and very sparsely hairy at first, growing just underground forming open mats. The leaves are deciduous, rounded, crenate to toothed and shiny green with paler undersides, 0.3–2 cm long and broad. Like other willows, it is dioecious, with male and female catkins on separate plants. As a result, the plant's appearance varies; the female catkins are red-coloured when ripe, while the male catkins are yellow-coloured.

References

External links
 
 

herbacea
Flora of the Arctic
Flora of Europe
Flora of North America
Flora of temperate Asia
Plants described in 1753
Taxa named by Carl Linnaeus